Dyckia choristaminea is a plant species in the genus Dyckia. It belongs to the order Poales. This species is native to Brazil.

Cultivars
 Dyckia 'June'
 Dyckia 'Keith Ryde'

References

BSI Cultivar Registry Retrieved 11 October 2009

choristaminea
Flora of Brazil